Branchiobdella is a genus of Branchiobdellidae.

The genus was described in 1823 by Odier.

It has cosmopolitan distribution.

Species:
 Branchiobdella astaci
 Branchiobdella parasita
 Branchiobdella pentodonta

References

Clitellata